Spring Parade is a 1940 American musical comedy film directed by Henry Koster and starring Deanna Durbin. It is a remake of the 1934 film.

Plot
Based on a story by Ernst Marischka, the film is about a Hungarian woman who attends a Viennese fair and buys a card from a gypsy fortune teller which says she will meet someone important and is destined for a happy marriage. Soon after the woman gets a job as a baker's assistant and meets a handsome army drummer who dreams of becoming a famous composer and conductor, but is held back by the military which discourages original music. Wanting to help the army drummer, the woman sends one of his waltzes to the Austrian Emperor with his weekly order of pastries, which leads to the tuneful and joyous fulfillment of the gypsy's prediction.

Cast
 Deanna Durbin as Ilonka Tolnay
 Robert Cummings as Corporal Harry Marten
 Mischa Auer as Gustav
 Henry Stephenson as Emperor Franz Joseph
 S. Z. Sakall as Laci Teschek - the Baker
 Billy Lenhart as Max
 Kenneth Brown as Moritz
 Walter Catlett as Headwaiter
 Anne Gwynne as Jenny
 Allyn Joslyn as Count Zorndorf
 Peggy Moran as Archduchess Irene
 Reginald Denny as The Major
 Stanley Blystone as Detective (uncredited)
 Paul Hurst as Headwaiter (uncredited)

Production
In January 1940 Universal announced Durbin's next film would be Spring Parade. Joe Pasternak called it "a musical of Old Vienna" that was similar to Blossom Time. It was a remake of a film Pasternak had made in 1934.

Cummings was cast in March 1940.
Filming took place from 27 May to August 1940.

Koster called it "a lovely picture" although he said Durbin "was getting a little more demanding" during filming. On one occasion they were filming after midnight and Durbin went home because she did not want to work that late. Koster threatened to quit the movie but the two made up.

Awards
The film was nominated for four Academy Awards.
 Best Cinematography (Black-and-White) (Joseph Valentine)
 Best Original Song (Robert Stolz and Gus Kahn, for "Waltzing in the Clouds")
 Best Musical Score (Charles Previn)
 Best Sound Recording (Bernard B. Brown)

Spring Parade received four Academy Award nominations for Best Cinematography, Best Original Song, Best Musical Score, and Best Sound Recording.

References

External links

 
 
Spring Parade at TCMDB

1940 films
1940 musical comedy films
1940 romantic comedy films
American musical comedy films
American romantic comedy films
American romantic musical films
1940s English-language films
Films directed by Henry Koster
Films set in Austria
Films set in the 1890s
Universal Pictures films
Films produced by Joe Pasternak
American remakes of foreign films
Remakes of Austrian films
1940s romantic musical films
American black-and-white films
1940s American films